Texas Civil Rights Project (TCRP) is an 501(c)(3) nonprofit organization based in Austin, Texas, that advocates for voter rights, racial and economic justice, and criminal justice reform. It was formed in 1990 by attorney James C. Harrington.

History
The South Texas Project (STP) was founded in 1972 by the ACLU. In 1978, attorney James C. Harrington created Oficina Legal del Pueblo Unido, Inc. (OLPU) as a grassroots foundation in South Texas. STP came under the auspices of OLPU soon after OLPU was founded. OLPU was a part of the late-1960s farm worker movement headed by César Chávez. Chávez's efforts to organize the South Texas farm worker community and to ultimately secure union contracts for them led to the birth of both OLPU and the United Farm Workers. OLPU is one of the oldest and foremost proponents of civil rights in the Rio Grande Valley, and has long worked on behalf of farm workers, abused immigrant women, people with disabilities, and economically disadvantaged people along the US/Mexico border.

In September 1990, James Harrington founded Texas Civil Rights Project (TCRP) as a program of OLPU in Austin, Texas. STP also became a project of TCRP the same year. Harrington would go on to direct TCRP for 25 years, growing the organization into the sophisticated legal advocacy organization it is today.

In February 2016, Mimi Marziani, a nationally recognized expert in voting rights and democracy reform, was announced as the group's second Executive Director. Under Marziani's leadership, TCRP has become internationally recognized in issues of racial and economic justice, voting rights, and criminal justice reform.

Office locations and service areas
Today, TCRP's main office is located at the Michael Tigar Human Rights Center in Austin, Texas. Other regional offices are Houston, Dallas, San Antonio, and South Texas, which remained in its initial location in San Juan until the grand opening of its new facility in Alamo, Texas, on June 22, 2011. Most recently, TCRP opened an office in San Antonio in 2018. While TCRP operates out of these regional offices, its services are available to individuals across the state.

Issues
TCRP has traditionally worked on the issues related to voting rights, institutional discrimination, criminal justice, and First Amendment rights. Today, TCRP's focus is honed on voting rights, racial and economic justice, and criminal justice reform, which are divided across three programmatic teams.

In 2016, TCRP's advocacy was geared towards improving Texas' voter registration system.

Special programs

Immigrant victims services 
An estimated five million Texans have experienced family violence in their lifetimes and immigrants are even more vulnerable to exploitation and abuse than their citizen counterparts. TCRP empowers immigrant victims of abuse to leave abusers and become self-sufficient by providing direct legal services, as well as providing education and community advocacy to support survivors. Specifically:
 TCRP provides direct legal services to more than 1,500 victims of abuse on an annual basis.
 In 2015, TCRP's program educated more than 500 people about the best practices for working with battered immigrants.
 TCRP's services are focused in rural Texas.

Veterans services 
Texas is home to over 1.6 million veterans of military service, the highest number in the nation. Veterans returning from deployment sometimes have mental, emotional, and physical injuries stemming from their service. TCRP empowers veterans and educates the community to remove any stigma the effects of war may still carry. TCRP provides advocacy and legal assistance to veterans with disabilities who experience serious civil rights violations or who face discrimination. TCRP also hosts "Know Your Rights" presentations with a focus on veterans' issues. In addition to offering veterans the same services TCRP offers all individuals for civil rights protections, TCRP also works on several issues most common to veterans. Specifically:
 TCRP ensures service animals are not denied entry to protected public places.
 TCRP advocates for the expansion of Veteran Treatment Courts.
 TCRP assists veterans with discharge status upgrades.
 TCRP is accredited to assist veterans with applications for VA benefits when they are assisting those individuals with an accompanying legal issue.

Major litigation

Disability rights
TCRP's efforts to promote ballot accessibility for blind voters have set the national model for ballot accessibility and their annual regional Americans with Disabilities Act of 1990 (ADA) compliance campaigns throughout Texas to commemorate every anniversary of the ADA (see Disability Campaign below) have prompted a myriad of businesses and public facilities to become more accessible to elderly and disabled persons. In 2010 for example, TCRP sued Austin Duck Tours, Congressman Lamar Smith's Austin office, Pure Nightclub in downtown Austin, and the University of Texas at Austin School of Architecture, among other Austin-area establishments, for ADA compliance.

TCRP also helped a woman in a wheelchair sue a Texas movie theater, resulting in national requirements for wheelchair accessibility in theaters.

To commemorate the anniversary of the ADA, TCRP holds a disability rights campaign every summer. TCRP teams up with people from the disability community to enforce the compliance of Texas businesses and institutions with the ADA. In past years, TCRP has sued city buildings, schools, retail stores, restaurants, and hotels, among other businesses, to enforce ADA compliance.

Rural economic justice
TCRP helps farm laborers and other low-income workers rectify injustice in the workplace and improve working conditions. TCRP's efforts have addressed wage claims, sexual harassment by crew leaders and managers of housing projects, field sanitation, and protecting the right to organize to improve labor conditions and life in the colonias.

To combat predatory financial practices, TCRP also conducts community education and litigation on behalf of low-income Hispanic families cheated on fraudulent land-purchase schemes and exorbitant water district fees in colonias, unincorporated low-income communities along the Texas-Mexico border that often lack basic infrastructure such as potable water, access to electricity, and paved roads.

Title IX compliance in secondary school
To ensure that girls and young women in Texas schools receive equal treatment and opportunities, TCRP implemented extensive educational efforts and litigation in rural communities regarding student peer sexual harassment and comparable sports and educational benefits in Texas schools.

Racial discrimination
TCRP also assisted Texans who were discriminated against after the 9/11 attacks. These included American citizens, permanent residents, and university students with South Asian or Arab backgrounds. For example, TCRP helped Mohammed Ali Ahmed, an American citizen asked to leave an American Airlines flight with his three children after the pilot saw his name on the passenger manifesto, file suit against American Airlines.

In 2009 TCRP filed a racial discrimination suit against employees of a West Texas inn, on behalf of Gwenda Gault, a woman whose hotel reservation was rejected by the hotel manager because of her race.

Criminal justice system
The Texas Youth Commission (TYC), a juvenile detention center that earned notoriety after allegations of child sexual abuse emerged, was sued by TCRP on behalf of four children who were physically and sexually abused by TYC guards. In addition to the $625,000 paid to the plaintiffs, TYC also agreed to make significant changes to its operations as a result of the lawsuit.

TCRP also brought a case against the Otero County Sheriff's Department, which resulted in sweeping reform and increased training within the police force, after officials illegally searched homes, harassed and interrogated residents, and racially profiled and stopped citizens in an effort to target undocumented immigrants.

TCRP also represented a magazine publisher and filed suit against a jail that had denied inmates access to the publication Prison Legal News. The jail was required to modify policy as a consequence.

The efforts of TCRP's Prisoners' RIghts Program have also led to greater due process rights for paroled Texas prisoners.

Police brutality
When police responded to a report of a mentally ill man sleeping at a bus station, an officer beat him with a baton and filed a false report causing the man to spend ten weeks in jail. TCRP represented the man in a lawsuit requiring the city to pay him a total of $62,000.

A police officer slammed an African American college student to the ground, knocking him unconscious, after the student complained the officer was treating an unrelated suspect too harshly. When an ambulance arrived to take the student to hospital, the officer took him out of the ambulance and sent him to jail instead. A TCRP lawsuit forced the city to pay $31,000.

Protecting free speech
TCRP sued the City of Round Rock in 2006, after hundreds of students were arrested and charged with truancy for leaving their classes to protest anti-immigrant sentiment and legislation. The suit was filed on behalf of 98 students whom TCRP represented, claiming that their First Amendment rights had been violated, and was eventually won. The City of Round Rock was forced to halt all prosecutions, erase the arrests from the students' records, and arrange a scholarship fund for the students.

The organization also sued the City of Austin in 2001, after protestors demonstrating against then President George W. Bush's first visit back to Austin were blocked by police from entering the free speech zone near the Texas Governor's mansion. Eventually, in 2006, a district judge ruled that the City had indeed violated the protestors' First Amendment rights.

When Raul G. Salinas, Mayor of Laredo, had issues of local newspaper LareDOS removed from distribution because they contained criticism and caricatures of Salinas, TCRP sued on behalf of the newspaper. TCRP Director James C. Harrington called Salinas' actions "classic political retaliation" against unfavorable coverage. As a result of the suit, Salinas was fined $15,000 and was forced to apologize for violating freedom of the press.

When members of the San Angelo-based American White Knights of the Ku Klux Klan (KKK) came to Austin City Hall to demonstrate in support of Proposition 2, the Texas constitutional amendment that banned gay marriage in 2005, about 3,000 counterprotesters flooded downtown Austin to demonstrate against them. However, the counterprotesters were met by police barricades that kept the counterprotesters two blocks away from where the KKK was demonstrating. Because the counterprotesters were prevented from exercising their rights to free speech and members of the independent media were blocked by the city from covering the protests, TCRP sued the City of Austin for violating the First Amendment. This suit eventually required the city to "establish reasonable perimeters for future demonstrations, and establish objective press credentialing criteria."

Right to privacy
In 2010, the organization sued the Texas State Department of State Health Services, after Texas parents discovered that the State was, without parental consent, creating a database of newborn babies' blood with the leftover blood from the testing of newborns for serious genetic diseases. The State was also selling these baby blood samples to pharmaceutical companies and the Armed Forces Institute of Pathology, and bartering with it for medical supplies. The lawsuit was settled and all samples taken and stored without parental consent were destroyed. The Texas Legislature took additional action, requiring the State to obtain parental consent to store future samples through an "opt out" consent form.

See also
 Civil and political rights
 United States Bill of Rights
 Violence Against Women Act
 Violence against LGBT people

References 
 FROM MICHIGAN’S STRAWBERRY FIELDS TO SOUTH TEXAS’S RIO GRANDE VALLEY: THE SAGA OF A LEGAL CAREER AND THE TEXAS CIVIL RIGHTS PROJECT, CUNY Law Review (vol. 19.2), http://www.cunylawreview.org/wp-content/uploads/2016/09/From-Michigans-Strawberry-Fields-to-South-Texass-Rio-Grande-Valley-The-Saga-of-a-Legal-Career-and-The-Texas-Civil-Rights-Project.pdf

External links 

Civil rights organizations in the United States
Legal advocacy organizations in the United States
Texas law
Education in Texas